E. nivea may refer to:
 Eatonella nivea, a plant species
 Eremophila nivea, the silky eremophila, a shrub species native to Western Australia

See also 
 Nivea (disambiguation)